William J. Babcock (April 8, 1841 – October 29, 1897) was an American soldier who received the Medal of Honor for valor during the American Civil War.

Biography
Babcock was born in Griswold, Connecticut. He served in the Union Army during the American Civil War in the 2nd Rhode Island Infantry and was promoted to the rank of Color Sergeant.  He received the Medal of Honor for his actions at the Third Battle of Petersburg in an assault on Confederate defenses on April 2, 1865.  Babcock was the first to enter the Confederate lines and planted the colors on top of the Confederate works.  He was awarded the Medal of Honor on March 2, 1895, almost 30 years after his actions. 

After the war, he married Phebe Babcock (1845-1900) by whom he had five sons and two daughters. Sergeant Babcock died in 1897 and is buried with his wife in the Riverside Cemetery in South Kingstown, Rhode Island.

Medal of Honor citation
Citation:

Planted the flag upon the parapet while the enemy still occupied the line; was the first of his regiment to enter the works.

See also

List of American Civil War Medal of Honor recipients: A-F

References

External links

Military Times

1841 births
1897 deaths
People from Griswold, Connecticut
Union Army soldiers
United States Army Medal of Honor recipients
People of Rhode Island in the American Civil War
American Civil War recipients of the Medal of Honor
Military personnel from Connecticut
People from South Kingstown, Rhode Island